Murderaz-e Olya (also Romanized as Mūrderāz-e ‘Olyā; also known as Mūrderāz-e Bālā) is a village in Sarrud-e Jonubi Rural District, in the Central District of Boyer-Ahmad County, Kohgiluyeh and Boyer-Ahmad Province, Iran. At the 2006 census, its population was 353, in 70 families.

References 

Populated places in Boyer-Ahmad County